Zhang Li (born 1 April 1957) is a Chinese director and cinematographer best known for his directorial works Towards the Republic (2001), Ming Dynasty in 1566 (2006), Memories In China (2007), The Road We Have Taken (2008), and Young Marshal (2014).

Zhang became a frequent collaborator with director Feng Xiaogang, as cinematographer on his films Sigh (2000), Big Shot's Funeral (2001), A World Without Thieves (2004), and The Banquet (2006).

Early life and education
Zhang was born in Tangshan, Hebei, on April 1, 1957. In 1974, before the end of the Cultural Revolution, he became a sent-down youth in Pingjiang County, Hunan. He was also a back man in Xiaoxiang Film Studio. In 1978, he enrolled at Beijing Film Academy, where he studied alongside Zhang Yimou, Gu Changwei, Chen Kaige, Li Shaohong, and Tian Zhuangzhuang. After graduation, he was assigned to Xiaoxiang Film Studio.

Career
Zhang made his directorial debut Jungle Escape in 1986, but the film has not been released.

In 1989, he directed Fake Hero, a drama film starring Niu Ben, Ji Ling, Feng Shun and Yan Bide.

In 1995, Zhang shot Ye Daying's Red Cherry, for which he received the Best Cinematography nomination at the 16th Golden Rooster Awards.

Zhang's cinematographic career began in 1990 with cinematographer Chi Xiaoning and director Chen Guoxing on their film Roaring Across the Horizon, which earned him a Best Cinematography at the 20th Golden Rooster Awards.

Zhang worked with director Feng Xiaogang in 2000 Sigh, the film stars Zhang Guoli, Liu Bei, Xu Fan and Fu Biao. The film won several awards at the 24th Cairo Film Festival, including Best Screenplay, Best Actor and Best Actress.

In 2001, he directed Towards the Republic, a historical television series starring Wang Bing, Lyu Zhong, Sun Chun, Ma Shaohua and Li Guangjie. At the same year, he served as cinematographer for Big Shot's Funeral, his second collaboration with director Feng Xiaogang. The film stars Ge You, Rosamund Kwan and Donald Sutherland.

In 2004, Zhang  was selected as cinematographer for the action drama film A World Without Thieves, his third collaboration with Feng Xiaogang. The film stars Andy Lau, Rene Liu, Ge You, Wang Baoqiang and Li Bingbing. It was released in China on December 5, 2004.

In 2006, he went on to serve as cinematographer for The Banquet. He won the Best Cinematography at the 51st Asia Pacific Film Festival, and received the Best Cinematography nomination at the 43rd Golden Horse Awards. That same year, he directed Ming Dynasty in 1566, the series has a score of 9.6 out of 10. It is one of the highest scores in TV series on Douban.

In 2007, he directed Memories In China, which earned him a Best Full-length TV series at the 4th Seoul International Drama Awards and a Third Prize of the Flying Apsaras Awards.

In 2008, Zhang directed The Road We Have Taken, the series stars Sun Honglei, Huang Zhizhong, Ke Lan, Rolling Zhang, Zhang Zhijian, and Guo Guangping. He won numerous awards, including the Outstanding TV series at 25th China TV Golden Eagle Award, the Best Television Series at the 16th Shanghai TV Festival, the First Prize of the Flying Apsaras Awards, and the Best Director at the 16th Shanghai TV Festival. That same year, he shot the epic war film Red Cliff with Lü Yue. The film was directed by John Woo and stars Tony Leung, Takeshi Kaneshiro, Zhang Fengyi, Chang Chen, Zhao Wei, Hu Jun and Lin Chi-ling.

In 2011, Zhang co-directed with Jackie Chan in 1911. The film stars Winston Chao, Jackie Chan, Li Bingbing and Sun Chun. The rest of the principal cast, including Jaycee Chan, Hu Ge, Yu Shaoqun, Joan Chen, Huang Zhizhong, Jiang Wu, Ning Jing, Jiang Wenli, Mei Ting, Wei Zongwan, Dennis To, Wang Ziwen, Tobgyal, Simon Dutton, and James Lee Guy. The film won the Outstanding Film at the 21st Golden Rooster and Hundred Flowers Film Festival.

In 2013, he directed Forty Nine Days, adapted from Geling Yan's novel The Flowers of War.

In 2014, Zhang directed Young Marshal, a biographical historical drama television series centered on Zhang Xueliang, a warlord in the Republic of China (1912-1949) during the early 20 century. The drama stars Wen Zhang as Zhang Xueliang, alongside Li Xuejian as Zhang's father, Song Jia as Zhang's first wife Yu Fengzhi and Zhang Xinyi as Zhang's second wife Edith Chao.

In 2016, Zhang directed Martial Universe, a TV series adaptation based on the internet novel of the same name by Tiancan Tudou. The series stars Yang Yang, Zhang Tian'ai, Chun Wu, Wang Likun, Ashton Chen, and Ada Liu. The series set to air on Hunan Television and will premiere in 2018.

In 2017, Zhang directed Cao Cao, based on the life of Cao Cao, a warlord and the penultimate Chancellor of the Eastern Han dynasty who rose to great power in the final years of the dynasty. Actor Jiang Wen confirmed that he would portray the male lead.

Personal life
Zhang Li married actress Liu Bei in 2003, the couple have a son, they divorced after three year of the marriage.

Filmography

As cinematographer

As director

As producer

As art director

Film and TV Awards

References

External links
 
 Zhang Li Douban 
 Zhang Li Mtime 

1957 births
People from Tangshan
Living people
Beijing Film Academy alumni
Chinese cinematographers
Chinese film directors
Chinese television directors
Chinese film producers
Chinese television producers